Yemisi Aribisala (born 27 April 1973) is a Nigerian essayist, writer, painter, and food memoirist. She has been described as having a "fearless, witty, and unapologetic voice" Her work has been featured in The New Yorker, Vogue magazine, Chimurenga, Popula, Google Arts & Culture, The Johannesburg Review of Books, Critical Muslim 26: Gastronomy, Sandwich Magazine (The African Scramble), The Guardian (UK), Aké Review, and Olongo Africa.

Aribisala is renowned for her work in documenting Nigerian food as an entry point to thinking and understanding the culture and society. Her first book, Longthroat Memoirs: Soups, Sex, and the Nigerian Taste Buds, won the John Avery Prize at the André Simon Book Awards 2016. Her work has also appeared in New Daughters of Africa: An International Anthology of Writing by Women of African Descent (edited by Margaret Busby); In the Kitchen: Essays on Food and Life, and The Best American Food Writing 2019 (edited by Samin Nosrat).

Aribisala currently lives in London, United Kingdom.

Life and career 
Aribisala attended the University of Wolverhampton, England, where she obtained a law degree in 1995. She subsequently earned a master's degree in Legal Aspects of Maritime Affairs and International Transport from the University of Wales, Cardiff, in 1997.

Writing 
She was the founding editor of the trailblazing Nigerian literary and culture publication Farafina Magazine.

From 2009 to 2011, she was the food columnist at the now-defunct, groundbreaking 234Next newspaper, where she first gained public attention, writing under the name "Yẹ́misí Ogbe". She regularly contributes to literary publications, including the Chimurenga Chronicle, the avant-garde culture newspaper.

Works

Longthroat Memoirs 
On 31 October 2016, Aribisala's debut book of essays was published in Nigeria by Cassava Republic Press. It was titled Longthroat Memoirs: Soups, Sex, and the Nigerian Taste Buds, a collection of essays exploring "the cultural politics and erotics of Nigerian cuisine". It has been well received, being shortlisted for an André Simon Food and Drink Book Award and winning the John Avery Award.

Of her work the following has been said: "It is difficult to translate senses through words, but Aribisala manages to communicate the tastes, tickles and aromas of various African spices and ingredients wonderfully." The book has been described as "part straight cookbook, part cultural history, part travelogue, part intimate confessional, it's as complex and mysterious as one of the Nigerian soups Aribisala describes so evocatively in its pages" and a work "that carries the weight of so much cultural and literary burden, and manages to discharge it with grace and style." "[S]he joins thinkers like Chinua Achebe in rejecting the stereotype of the African writer as a mere storyteller, not a thinker."

She has been compared to writers such as Aminatta Forna and Binyavanga Wainaina who "play with the ontology of the 21st century African memoir, and oscillate between the deeply personal and the distinctly political"; a book that is a "mouth-watering appraisal of the cultural politics and erotics of Nigerian cuisine". The pages [of her book] sing with her clever, beautiful prose and sharp eye. It is a work "redolent with spice, rippling with humour and sexual innuendo, her memoirs conjure up fantasies that can only be satisfied by reading another chapter."

The cover image was designed by UK-based artist Lynn Hatzius, who said that her intention with the cover artwork was "to show how food culture is an ingrained part of us... I wanted the cover image to convey the joy of this and to invite the reader into Yemisi Aribisala's own celebration of food."

Prizes and honours 
In January 2017, Aribisala's debut book Longthroat Memoirs won the John Avery Prize at the André Simon Book Awards 2016.

In March 2017, Aribisala was listed as one of the 100 inspiring women in Nigeria in 2017.

On 13 February 2018, Longthroat Memoirs: Soups Sex & Nigerian Taste Buds was shortlisted for the 2018 Art of Eating Prize. https://artofeating.com/prize/short-list/

In the May 2018 Gourmand World Cookbook Awards, Longthroat Memoirs: Soups Sex & Nigerian Taste Buds won second place in the category of Best in the World in African Cuisine.

Selected writings 
"Boy in a Gèlè" (February 2021), in OlongoAfrica
The Beauty and Burden of Being a Nigerian Bride (September 2019), in The New Yorker
"The Girls Who Fainted at the Sight of an Egg" (January 2018), in The New Yorker
"Sister Outsider" (April 2016), at The Chimurenga Chronic
 "Nigeria's New Feminism – Say-You-Are-One-Of-Us-Or-Else" (October 2016), at KTravula
 "Mother Hunger" (November 2015), on Medium
 "Fish Soup as Love Potions" (March 2013), at The Chimurenga Chronic
 "Nollywood Kiss" (2011) at The Chimurenga Chronic
 "Giving It All Away in English" (March 2015) at The Chimurenga Chronic
 "High Heeled Fork" (December 2015) on Medium
 "Birthing The American" (December 2013), at The Chimurenga Chronic
 "Nigeria's Superstar Men of God" (April 2013) at The Chimurenga Chronic
 "Nigeria and a Culture of Disrespect" (August 2012), at Ikhide Ikheloa's blog
 "That Guy No Be Ordinary" (April 2016), at Chimurenga Chronic

Notable interviews/excerpts/reviews 
 "My repression is as legitimate as your freedom": A Conversation with Yẹ́misí Aríbisálà on AfricanWriter.com
 "'People try to squeeze Nigerian food into an all-encompassing African label'" | Book Excerpt in The Guardian, UK
 Q&A with TheGannet
 "Words Move More Deliberately Than Visual Images" | Interview in Short Story Day Africa.
 Calabar Witch by Akin Adesokan, in Chimurenga Chronic
 A Book for the Tasting by Kola Tubosun, on Village Factor
 Sanya Noel, "On Not Fitting In: An Interview with Yemisi Aribisala", Enkare Review, 11 February 2018. 
 Books: Yemisi Aribisala's Longthroat Memoirs. New Again by Edward Behr. https://artofeating.com/books-yemisi-aribisalas-longthroat-memoirs/

References 

1973 births
Living people
20th-century essayists
Nigerian columnists
Nigerian food writers
Alumni of the University of Wales
Alumni of the University of Wolverhampton
21st-century essayists
21st-century Nigerian women writers
21st-century Nigerian writers
English-language writers from Nigeria
Nigerian expatriates in South Africa
Nigerian memoirists
20th-century Nigerian women writers
Women memoirists
Nigerian women columnists